The 2012 Mersin Cup was a professional tennis tournament played on clay courts. It was the first edition of the tournament which was part of the 2012 ATP Challenger Tour. It took place in Mersin, Turkey between 9 and 15 April 2012.

ATP entrants

Seeds

 1 Rankings are as of April 2, 2012.

Other entrants
The following players received wildcards into the singles main draw:
  Can Altiner
  Haluk Akkoyun
  Barkin Yalcinkale
  Ergün Zorlu

The following players received entry from the qualifying draw:
  Jérôme Inzerillo
  Gabriel Moraru
  Ivan Nedelko
  Michal Schmid

The following players received entry from the qualifying draw as a lucky loser:
  Ľubomír Majšajdr

Champions

Singles

 João Sousa def.  Javier Martí, 6–4, 0–6, 6–4

Doubles

 Radu Albot /  Denys Molchanov def.  Alessandro Motti /  Simone Vagnozzi, 6–0, 6–2

External links
Official Website
ITF Search
ATP official site

Mersin Cup
Mersin Cup
2012 in Turkish tennis